The Chobanids or the Chupanids were descendants of a Mongol family of the Suldus clan that came to prominence in 14th century Persia. At first serving under the Ilkhans, they took de facto control of the territory after the fall of the Ilkhanate. The Chobanids ruled over Azerbaijan (where they were based), Arrān, parts of Asia Minor, Mesopotamia, and west central Persia, while the Jalayirids took control in Baghdad.

Amir Chupan and his sons

During the early 14th century, Amir Chupan served under three successive Ilkhans, beginning with Ghazan Mahmud. A military commander of note, Chupan quickly gained a degree of influence over the Ilkhans and married several members of the line of Hulagu Khan. His power fueled resentment among the nobility, who conspired against him in 1319 but failed. The Ilkhan Abu Sa'id, however, also disliked Chupan's influence and successfully eliminated him from court. He fled in 1327 to Herat, where the Kartids executed him. Several of his sons fled to the Golden Horde or the Mamluks of Egypt while others were killed.

Baghdad Khatun

The Chobanids were not completely wiped out from Persia. A daughter of Chupan's, Baghdad Katun, had caught the eye of Abu Sa'id. During Chupan's lifetime, she had been married to Hasan Buzurg, the future founder of the Jalayirids, but after Chupan fled Hasan Buzurg divorced her, and she married Abu Sa'id. She quickly gained influence over the Ilkhan and exercised the wide powers given to her. She was alleged (but never proven) to have been involved in any conspiracies against the Ilkhan, but was believed by some to have caused Abu Sa'id's death in 1335. Abu Sa'id's successor Arpa Ke'un executed her.

Role during the fall of the Ilkhanate, and Hasan-i Kuchak

Arpa Ke'un's position proved to be weak; when a granddaughter of Chupan, Delsad Katun, fled to Diyarbakr, it caused the governor of that region to attack and defeat the Ilkhan. During the strife that occurred in the next few years, individual members of the Chobanids sided with various factions, such as Arpa or Hasan Buzurg. The latter ended up marrying Delsad Katun, who provided for the heirs to the Jalayirid position.

While the Jalayirids were consolidating their position in Iraq, however, other Chobanid were also busy. Hasan Kucek, a grandson of Chupan, rallied much of the Chobanid family to his side and defeated the Jalayirids in 1338, paving the way for a Chobanid realm in the area around Tabriz. That same year, he elevated Sati Beg, sister of Abu Sa'id and widow of Chupan, to the Ilkhanid throne. To keep Sati Beg in check, he forced her to marry his puppet Suleiman Khan. Hasan Kucek continued to fight the Jalayirids (a fight which was further complicated by the incursions made by Togha Temur of Khurasan), but family infighting proved to be the most difficult challenge. Several members defected to the Jalayirids; in any case, Hasan Kucek was forced to deal with them up until his death in 1343.

Malek Ashraf and the Chobanid decline

A power struggle quickly emerged after Hasan Kucek's death. During the dispute, Hasan Kucek's brother Malek Asraf gained the upper hand and eliminated his uncles. By the end of 1344, Malek Asraf had gained effective control of the Chobanid lands. Like his predecessor, Malek Asraf used puppet monarchs from behind which he ruled. During his reign, the Chobanid attempted to capture Baghdad from the Jalayirids in 1347 but failed miserably. He also failed to seize Fars from the Injuids in 1350. As his reign wore on, Malek Asraf became more and more cruel, prompting widespread dissatisfaction amongst his subjects. When forces of the Golden Horde overran the Chobanid realm and captured Tabriz in 1357, few lamented the loss of power by the Chupanids. Malek Asraf was executed, and his family brought north to the Golden Horde. Malek Asraf's offspring were eventually killed off in Persia, bringing a definitive end to the Chobanids as a power.

Family tree

See also

Dai Chopan
Dey Chopan District
Chopan - a town in India

References

Sources

Further reading
 
 
 
 

 
1357 disestablishments in Asia
States and territories established in 1335
Former countries in the Middle East
Medieval Azerbaijan
Mongol dynasties